Jack Landau may refer to:

 Jack Landau (director) (1924–1966), American theatre director and designer
 Jack Landau (judge) (born 1953), justice of the Oregon Supreme Court
 Jacob Landau (journalist) (1934–2008), aka Jack Landau, American journalist

See also
 Jacob Landau (disambiguation)